Nguyễn Đình Hiệp (born 20 May 1990) is a Vietnamese footballer who plays as a forward for Long An.

References

1990 births
Living people
People from Nghệ An province
Vietnamese footballers
V.League 1 players
Song Lam Nghe An FC players
Haiphong FC players
Long An FC players
Association football forwards